John M. Dooley (September 29, 1897 – October 31, 1991) was an American football tackle and guard. He played college football for Syracuse and Bucknell and in the National Football League (NFL) for the Rochester Jeffersons in 1922 and 1924 to 1925 and for the Milwaukee Badgers in 1923. He appeared in 17 NFL games.

References

1897 births
1991 deaths
Syracuse Orange football players
Bucknell Bison football players
Rochester Jeffersons players
Milwaukee Badgers players
Players of American football from New York (state)